The 1981 NHL Entry Draft was the 19th NHL Entry Draft. It was held at the Montreal Forum in Montreal, Quebec. The National Hockey League (NHL) teams selected 211 players eligible for entry into professional ranks, in the reverse order of the 1980–81 NHL season and playoff standings. This is the list of those players selected.

The last active player in the NHL from this draft class was Chris Chelios, who retired after the 2009–10 season.

Selections by round
Below are listed the selections in the 1981 NHL Entry Draft. Club teams are located in North America unless otherwise noted.

Round one

Notes (Round 1)
1.* The Detroit Red Wings' first round pick went to the Los Angeles Kings as the result of a trade on August 22, 1979 that sent the right to Dale McCourt to the Detroit Red Wings in exchange for Andre St. Laurent, 1st round pick in 1980 NHL Entry Draft and Kings' option of a 2nd round pick in 1980 NHL Entry Draft or 1st round pick in 1981 NHL Entry Draft.  Kings optioned for this pick.

2.* The Colorado Rockies' first round pick went to the Washington Capitals as the result of a trade on June 10, 1981 that sent the 5th overall pick and 26th overall pick to the Colorado Rockies in exchange for the 45th overall pick and this pick.

3.* The Washington Capitals' first round pick went to the Colorado Rockies as the result of to a trade on June 10, 1981 that sent the 3rd overall pick and the 45th overall pick to the Washington Capitals in exchange for 26th overall pick and this pick.

4.* The Pittsburgh Penguins' first round pick went to the Montreal Canadiens as the result of to a trade on October 18, 1978 that sent Rod Schutt to the Pittsburgh Penguins in exchange for this pick.

5.* The Los Angeles Kings' first round pick went to the Montreal Canadiens as the result of to a trade on October 5, 1978 that sent Murray Wilson and the 1st round pick in 1979 to the Los Angeles Kings in exchange for this pick.

Round two

Notes (Round 2)
1.* The Colorado Rockies' second round pick went to the Toronto Maple Leafs as the result of a trade on October 19, 1978 that sent Jack Valiquette to the Colorado Rockies in exchange for this pick.

2.* The Hartford Whalers' second round pick went to the Chicago Black Hawks as the result of a trade on June 19, 1980 that sent Mike Veisor to the Hartford Whalers in exchange for this pick.

3.* The Washington Capitals' second round pick went to the Colorado Rockies as the result of to a trade on June 10, 1981 that sent the 3rd overall pick and the 45th overall pick to the Washington Capitals in exchange for 5th overall pick and this pick.

4.* The Toronto Maple Leafs' second round pick went to the Minnesota North Stars as the result of to a trade on March 10, 1981 that sent Ron Zanussi and the 55th overall pick to the Toronto Maple Leafs in exchange for this pick.

5.* The Vancouver Canucks' second round pick went to the Minnesota North Stars as the result of to a trade on December 10, 1979 that sent Olov Brasar to the Vancouver Canucks in exchange for this pick.

6.* The Quebec Nordiques' second round pick went to the Montreal Canadiens as the result of to a trade on June 9, 1979 that Quebec Nordiques promise to take Dan Geoffrion and/or Alain Cote, rather than Marc Tardif and/or Richard David in 1979 NHL Expansion Draft in exchange for the third round pick in 1980 and this pick.

7.* The Chicago Black Hawks' second round pick went to the Minnesota North Stars as the result of to a trade on December 29, 1980 that sent Glen Sharpley to the Chicago Black Hawks in exchange for Ken Solheim and this pick.

8.* The Calgary Flames' second round pick went to the St. Louis Blues as the result of to a trade on October 10, 1979 that sent Garry Unger to the Atlanta Flames in exchange for Ed Kea, Don Laurence, and this pick.  The Atlanta franchise relocated to Calgary for the 1980-81 NHL season.

9.* The St. Louis Blues' second round pick went to the Minnesota North Stars as the result of to a trade on June 15, 1978 that sent Bob Stewart and future considerations (Harvey Bennett) to the St. Louis Blues in exchange for this pick.

Round three

Notes (Round 3)
1.* The Colorado Rockies' third round pick went to the Washington Capitals as the result of a trade on June 10, 1981 that sent the 5th overall pick and the 26th overall pick to the Colorado Rockies in exchange for 3rd overall pick and this pick.

2.* The Hartford Whalers' third round pick went to the Montreal Canadiens as the result of a trade on June 5, 1980 that sent Rick Meagher, the 61st overall pick, and the 103rd overall pick to the Hartford Whalers in exchange for the 88th overall pick and this pick.

3.* The Washington Capitals' third round pick went to the Philadelphia Flyers as the result of to a trade on August 16, 1979 that sent Wayne Stephenson to the Washington Capitals in exchange for this pick.

4.* The Toronto Maple Leafs' third round pick went to the Colorado Rockies as the result of to a trade on June 30, 1981 that sent Rene Robert to the Toronto Maple Leafs in exchange for this pick.

5.* The Edmonton Oilers' third round pick went to the New York Rangers as the result of to a trade on March 11, 1980 that sent Don Murdoch to the Edmonton Oilers in exchange for Cam Connor and this pick.

6.* The Minnesota North Stars' third round pick went to the Toronto Maple Leafs as the result of to a trade on March 10, 1981 that sent the 27th overall pick to the Minnesota North Stars in exchange for Ron Zanussi and this pick.

7.* The Boston Bruins' third round pick went to the Calgary Flames as the result of to a trade on June 2, 1980 that sent Jim Craig to the Boston Bruins in exchange for the second round pick in 1980 and this pick.

8.* The Calgary Flames' third round pick went to the New York Islanders as the result of to a trade on October 9, 1980 that sent Alex McKendry to the Calgary Flames in exchange for this pick.

9.* The Los Angeles Kings' third round pick went to the Buffalo Sabres as the result of to a trade on March 10, 1981 that sent Rick Martin to the Los Angeles Kings in exchange for the first round pick in 1983 and this pick.

10.* The Montreal Canadiens' third round pick went to the Hartford Whalers as the result of to a trade on June 5, 1980 that sent the 46th overall pick and the 88th overall pick to the Los Angeles Kings in exchange for Rick Meagher, the 103rd overall pick, and this pick.

Round four

Notes (Round 4)
1.* The Detroit Red Wings' fourth round pick went to the Philadelphia Flyers as the result of a trade on September 4, 1979 that sent Dennis Sobchuk to the Detroit Red Wings in exchange for this pick.

2.* The Toronto Maple Leafs' fourth round pick went to the Minnesota North Stars as the result of a trade on June 14, 1978 that sent Paul Harrison to the Toronto Maple Leafs in exchange for this pick.

3.* The St. Louis Blues' fourth round pick went to the Buffalo Sabres as the result of to a trade on October 20, 1980 that sent Bill Stewart to the Washington Capitals in exchange for Bob Hess and this pick.

Round five

Notes (Round 5)
1.* The Hartford Whalers' fifth round pick went to the Montreal Canadiens as the result of a trade on June 5, 1980 that sent Rick Meagher, the 61st overall pick, and the 103rd overall pick to the Hartford Whalers in exchange for the 46th overall pick and this pick.

2.* The Pittsburgh Penguins' fifth round pick went to the Washington Capitals as the result of a trade on January 2, 1981 that sent Gary Rissling to the Pittsburgh Penguins in exchange for this pick.

3.* The New York Rangers' fifth round pick went to the Hartford Whalers as the result of to a trade on January 15, 1981 that sent Nick Fotiu to the New York Rangers in exchange for this pick.

4.* The Vancouver Canucks' fifth round pick went to the New York Islanders as the result of to a trade on October 6, 1980 that sent Richard Brodeur and the 105th overall pick to the Vancouver Canucks in exchange for this pick.

5.* The Los Angeles Kings' fifth round pick went to the Toronto Maple Leafs as the result of to a trade on March 10, 1981 that sent Jim Rutherford to the Los Angeles Kings in exchange for this pick.

6.* The Montreal Canadiens' fifth round pick went to the Hartford Whalers as the result of to a trade on June 5, 1980 that sent the 46th overall pick and the 88th overall pick to the Montreal Canadiens in exchange for Rick Meagher, the 61st overall pick, and this pick.

7.* The New York Islanders' fifth round pick went to the Vancouver Canucks as the result of to a trade on October 6, 1980 that sent the 94th overall pick to the New York Islanders in exchange for Richard Brodeur and this pick.

Round six

Notes (round 6)
1.* The Hartford Whalers' sixth round pick went to the Pittsburgh Penguins as the result of a trade on February 20, 1981, that sent Gilles Lupien to the Hartford Whalers in exchange for this pick.

2.* The Toronto Maple Leafs' sixth round pick went to the Edmonton Oilers as the result of a trade on August 22, 1979, that sent Reg Thomas to the Toronto Maple Leafs in exchange for this pick.

Round seven

Notes (Round 7)
1.* The Edmonton Oilers' seventh round pick went to the Los Angeles Kings as the result of a trade on March 10, 1981 that sent Garry Unger to the Edmonton Oilers in exchange for this pick.

2.* The Quebec Nordiques' seventh round pick went to the Philadelphia Flyers as the result of a trade on September 15, 1980 that sent Andre Dupont to the Quebec Nordiques in exchange for this pick.

Round eight

Round nine

Round ten

Round eleven

Notes (Round 11)
1.* Bonus selection awarded from NHL as compensation for accepting move from the Smythe Division to the Norris Division for the 1981–82 NHL season

Draftees based on nationality

See also
 1981–82 NHL season
 List of NHL players

Notes

References

External links
 HockeyDraftCentral.com
 1981 NHL Entry Draft player stats at The Internet Hockey Database

Draft
National Hockey League Entry Draft
NHL Entry Draft